The Empire Rose Stakes, is a Victoria Racing Club Group 1  Thoroughbred horse race held under Weight for Age conditions, for fillies and mares aged three-years-old and upwards, over a distance of 1600 metres, held at Flemington Racecourse, Melbourne, Australia during the VRC Spring Carnival on Victoria Derby day. Total prize money for the race is A$1,000,000.

History
The registered race is named after Empire Rose, the champion mare who won the 1988 LKS MacKinnon Stakes – Melbourne Cup double.

Name
 1988–1992 - The Honda Legend
 1993 - Hong Kong Bank Stakes
1994–2001 - Hardy Brothers Classic
2002–2004 - Nestle Peters Classic
2005–2017 - Myer Classic
2018 onwards - Empire Rose Stakes

Distance
1988 onwards - 1,600 metres

Grade
 1988–1994  - Listed Race
 1995–1996  - Group 3
 1997–2003  - Group 2
 2004 onwards - Group 1

Winners

 2022 - Icebath 
 2021 - Colette
 2020 - Shout The Bar 
 2019 - Melody Belle
 2018 - Shillelagh
 2017 - Shoals
 2016 - I Am A Star
 2015 - Politeness
 2014 - Bonaria
 2013 - Red Tracer
 2012 - Appearance
 2011 - Hurtle Myrtle
 2010 - Sacred Choice
 2009 - Typhoon Tracy
 2008 - Forensics
 2007 - Divine Madonna
 2006 - Lyrical Bid
 2005 - Lotteria
 2004 - Miss Potential
 2003 - Zanna
 2002 - Miss Zoe
 2001 - Market Price
 2000 - Super Sequel
 1999 - Noircir
 1998 - Bonanova
 1997 - Prairie
 1996 - Rose of Portland
 1995 - Aunty Mary
 1994 - Sedately
 1993 - Mingling Glances
 1992 - Excited Angel
 1991 - Western Chorus
 1990 - Natural Wonder
 1989 - Echo Lass
 1988 - Concordance

See also
 List of Australian Group races
 Group races

References

Mile category horse races for fillies and mares
Group 1 stakes races in Australia
Flemington Racecourse